Ingelow is a surname. Notable people with the surname include:

Benjamin Ingelow (1835–1926), British architect
Jean Ingelow (1820–1897), British poet and novelist

Swedish-language surnames